The D-Beam was originally manufactured by Interactive Light, as a stand-alone unit, around 1996. It was then soon purchased by Roland Corporation, becoming trademarked and rebranded as D-Beam Controller for their own music equipment.

Background
After being acquired by Roland, the D-Beam Controller was introduced on a larger scale through the Roland MC-505 in 1998, was further incorporated into a large number of Roland's grooveboxes, workstations, keyboards, and digital samplers over the years. The D-Beam is an interface that can control and manipulate sounds by hand movements interacting with an infrared beam of light. The controller is usually mounted in the equipment's panel facing upwards, and senses the performer's hand (or other body part) at a height of up to 15" (~40 cm) or so above the device. Although controlled in a similar manner to a theremin, the operating principles are fundamentally different; the theremin uses Capacitive sensing.

References

External links
 What is D-Beam?
 Circuit diagram for D-Beam components

 
Roland synthesizers
Gesture recognition